Queen Sunjeong of the Goksan Han clan was the second wife of King Gongmin of Goryeo who later became a queen consort after declared to be the legitimate mother of his illegitimate son, King U. She was called before as Palace Lady Han.

Biography

Ancestry

Life
In 1357 (6th year reign of Gongmin of Goryeo), she was chosen as the concubine of him and in the 1371, she was declared as the legal mother of Monino, the only son of King Gongmin. However, in 1374, it was falsely referred as the rebirth of the Han clan. Later, on November in the same year, she was posthumously honoured as Queen Sunjeong (순정왕후, 順靜王后) and received her full Posthumous name along with her orientation in Hyemyeong Hall (혜명전, 惠明殿).

In September 1376 (2nd year reign of King U of Goryeo), she was buried in Uireung Tomb (의릉, 懿陵), Jeongneung-dong, Yeoreung-ri, Jungseo-myeon, Gaepung-gun, foot of Bongmyeong Mountain, west of Gaeseong which the location is corresponds to the west of Hyeolleung (현릉, 玄陵; King Gongmin's tomb) and Jeongneung (정릉, 正陵; Queen Indeok's tomb). However, in December 1389 (1st year reign of Gongyang of Goryeo), the tomb was abolished.

In popular culture
Portrayed by Choi Jung-won in the 2005–2006 MBC TV series Shin Don.

References

Royal consorts of the Goryeo Dynasty
14th-century Korean people
Year of birth unknown
Year of death unknown